Shay Youngblood (born 1959) is an American novelist, playwright, and author of short stories.

Youngblood has worked as a public information assistant for WPBA in Atlanta and as a Peace Corps volunteer in Dominica.

Early life and education 
Shay Youngblood was born in Columbus, Georgia, in 1959.
Many elements of Youngblood's life are reflected in her fiction. Like many of her heroines, Youngblood herself was an orphan at an early age. Her mother died when she about two years old, and she was raised by a community family: grandfathers, uncles and many women with similarities to those described in her books and plays.

Youngblood was one of the first people in her family to attend college. While earning her bachelor's degree in mass communication at Clark-Atlanta University, she participated in a service project in Haiti. Her work in Haiti heightened her awareness of the injustice suffered by poor people in many places around the world. Immediately after graduating she joined the Peace Corps, and in 1981 she served as an agricultural information officer in Dominica, in the Eastern Caribbean. Later on, in 1993, Shay earned her MFA in Creative Writing form Brown University.

Career 
Youngblood is recognized as a poet, playwright, fiction writer, and has also written, produced, and directed two short videos. She is best known for her three texts, The Big Mama Stories, Soul Kiss and her most recent novel, Black Girl in Paris. Youngblood states that her first published text, The Big Mama Stories, is the closest to autobiographical of all of her works. This compilation of short stories focuses on the coming of age of a poor, young African-American girl named Chile. Chile's biological mother, Fannie Mae, has died and so Chile and her brother go to live with a woman called "Big Mama," who raises the children with the help of the entire community.

Her fiction, articles and essays have been published in Oprah magazine, Good Housekeeping, BlackBook and Essence magazines, among many other publications. 
Her plays - Amazing Grace, Shakin' the Mess Outta Misery and Talking Bones - have been widely produced. Other plays by Youngblood include Black Power Barbie and Communism Killed My Dog. She also completed a radio play, Explain Me the Blues, for WBGO Public Radio's Jazz Play Series.

Youngblood is a board member of  both Yaddo artists' colony and the Authors Guild. She has taught creative writing at NYU and was the 2002-03 John and Renee Grisham Writer in Residence at the University of Mississippi. She also taught writing at the Syracuse Community Writer's Project as well as playwriting at the Rhode Island Adult Institution for Women and Brown University. She currently lives in Texas where she teaches creative writing at Texas A&M University.

Awards 
Shay Youngblood has been the recipient of numerous grants and awards including a Pushcart Prize for her short story, "Born With Religion." She has also received the Lorraine Hansberry Playwriting Award, the Astaea Writes' Award for Fiction, a 2004 New York Foundation for the Arts Sustained Achievement Award, an Edward Albee honoree, and several NAACP Theater Awards.

References

Further reading
Hans Ostrom. "Shay Youngblood," in The Greenwood Encyclopedia of African American Literature. Ed. Hans Ostrom and J. David Macey. Westport, CT: Greenwood Publishers, 2005. Volume 5, 1803-1804.

External links
 Official website, containing a complete list of her published works
 Shay Youngblood
 Shay Youngblood
 VG: Artist Biography: Youngblood, Shay
 Women of Color Women of Word—African American Female Playwrights – Shay Youngblood

1959 births
Living people
Brown University alumni
African-American women writers
African-American writers
American writers
American lesbian writers
LGBT African Americans
21st-century African-American people
21st-century African-American women
20th-century African-American people
20th-century African-American women